Aphanius shirini, the Shirin toothcarp, or Khosroshirin tooth-carp, is a species of pupfish belonging to the family Cyprinodontidae. It is found in the Khosroshirin stream of the Kor River basin, Fars Province, Iran. The species is threatened by the introduction of the carnivorous rainbow trout to their habitat. It is harmless to humans.

References

Fish of Iran
shirini
Taxa named by Zeinab Gholami
Taxa named by Hamid Reza Esmaeili
Taxa named by Dirk Erpenbeck
Taxa named by Bettina Reichenbacher
Fish described in 2014